The bare-eyed rail (Gymnocrex plumbeiventris) is a species of bird in the family Rallidae.
It is found in Indonesia and Papua New Guinea.
Its natural habitats are subtropical or tropical moist lowland forests and subtropical or tropical moist montane forests.

References

bare-eyed rail
Birds of the Maluku Islands
Birds of New Guinea
Birds of New Ireland Province
bare-eyed rail
bare-eyed rail
Taxonomy articles created by Polbot